Ribes sardoum, commonly called Sardinian currant, is a species of plant in the gooseberry family. It is endemic to Italy, found only on the island of Sardinia.

Distribution
The species grows on limestone substrates.

Its natural habitats are in Mediterranean shrubby vegetation and rocky areas. It is an IUCN Red List Critically Endangered plant species and IUCN Top 50 Campaign Mediterranean Island Plants, threatened by habitat loss. The total number of individuals is about 100.

References

sardoum
Plants described in 1895
Flora of Sardinia
Endemic flora of Italy
Critically endangered plants
Taxonomy articles created by Polbot